John Curtis Thomas (March 3, 1941 – January 15, 2013) was an American track and field athlete who set several world records in the high jump using the straddle technique. As a youth,  he earned the Eagle Scout award.  At the age of 17, while a freshman at Boston University, Thomas became the first man to clear 7 feet (2.13 m) indoors. He subsequently pushed the world indoor record to 7'1½" (2.17 m), and broke the world outdoor record three times, with a career best jump of 7'3¾" (2.22 m) in 1960 while just 20 years old.

Thomas' meteoric career briefly captivated the track world, but he failed to win an Olympic gold medal, despite being favored to win in both the 1960 and 1964 Games.

In 1960, he settled for the bronze medal behind Russia's Robert Shavlakadze (gold), and Valeriy Brumel (silver). Thomas's failure in 1960 on Thursday 1 September was accompanied by other failures that day by American favorites, and the day become known as 'Black Thursday'.

In 1964 he was again beaten by Brumel, who cleared the same top height as Thomas, but was declared the winner based on fewer misses at lower heights. John Rambo won the bronze in 1964.

Thomas is an inductee of the USATF Hall of Fame.

Jumping orientation 
Thomas planted his left foot for take-off and high kicked with his right leg that would lead over the bar.

Biography
Thomas was born in Boston and grew up in Cambridge, Massachusetts. His father Curtis was a bus driver and his mother Ida was a kitchen employee at Harvard University.

He graduated from Boston University in 1963 with a bachelor's degree in physical and psychological rehabilitation.

Thomas retired from competition at the age of 27 and became a businessman. He later served as an assistant coach at Boston University and athletic director at Roxbury Community College.

Thomas died at age 71 while undergoing vascular surgery at a Brockton, Massachusetts hospital.

References

1941 births
2013 deaths
American male high jumpers
Boston University College of Health and Rehabilitation Sciences (Sargent College) alumni
Athletes (track and field) at the 1960 Summer Olympics
Athletes (track and field) at the 1964 Summer Olympics
World record setters in athletics (track and field)
Use mdy dates from August 2011
Medalists at the 1964 Summer Olympics
Medalists at the 1960 Summer Olympics
Olympic silver medalists for the United States in track and field
Olympic bronze medalists for the United States in track and field
African-American male track and field athletes